Emma Ellingsen (born 9 September 2001) is a Norwegian model and YouTuber. Her YouTube channel features make up tutorials, video vlogs, and travel vlogs. Ellingsen is signed with the Oslo-based modeling agency Team Models.

Early life 
Ellingsen grew up in Nøtterøy, a town that is an hour's train ride away from Oslo. Ellingsen came out to her family and friends as transgender when she was around nine years old. As a child she was featured in the Norwegian documentary Born in the Wrong Body which focused on her and other transgender children in Norway.

Career 
By age 17, the young model had appeared on several cover stories for Norwegian fashion magazines and had appeared in international publications like W magazine, which has a readership of around half a million. Her follower count on social media at this time was very high, facilitating partnerships with multiple brands and modelling agencies. Currently one of the hottest names on Scandinavian social media, Ellingsen is an emerging YouTube star, with her looks, wit, and laidback style attracting a large fanbase. Ellingsen had started publishing YouTube videos in English at age 15 in order to reach an audience worldwide, resulting in her subscriber count increasing dramatically from 40,000 in September 2017 to around 300,000 a year later. Ellingsen is one of the most-followed people from Norway on social media. She now has over 600,000 followers on Instagram. She also has 1.7 million likes and over 150,000 followers on TikTok.

In January 2018 Ellingsen was named 'influencer of the year' at the See and Hear Celebrity Gala. As a 17-year-old she was also nominated for the 2018 'name of the year' award given by Dagbladet newspaper, one of the largest newspapers in Norway.

In 2018, she took a year off from school to focus on her modeling and social media career.

Ellingsen was the central figure in ELLE Norway's June 2019 issue.

Once described as "Norway's rising Kendall Jenner", Ellingsen has stated that she admires Jenner's "laid-back" style, and that she gets "a lot of inspiration from her and whoever else I see on my Explore page on Instagram—when it's not all makeup and cute boys".

Ellingsen has worked for fashionble clothing seller NA-KD, modelling products and creating her own influencer collections. In June 2020, it was announced that Ellingsen would feature in the Norwegian TV Series The Bloggers.

She stars in the television series Generation Z, which came out 2018. In 2020, Ellingsen released a book, Emma.

References 

Living people
2001 births
Fashion influencers
Norwegian female models
Norwegian YouTubers
Norwegian transgender people
LGBT YouTubers
Beauty and makeup YouTubers
People from Tønsberg
People from Nøtterøy
Transgender models
YouTube travel vloggers
YouTube vloggers
21st-century Norwegian LGBT people